Make America Psycho Again is the first remix album by Fall Out Boy, released on October 30, 2015. The album is a remixed version of the band's original album American Beauty/American Psycho, and features a different rapper on each song. The album drew in over 13,000 equivalent copies in the United States its debut week. The title alludes to the "Make America Great Again" campaign slogan used by then-presidential candidate Donald Trump during the 2016 election cycle. The album artwork features a red-tinted photo of the same face-painted boy from the original cover, holding a sparkler.

Promotion
The album was preceded by four promotional singles; "Irresistible" featuring American hip hop-trap trio Migos was released on October 23, 2015. "American Beauty/American Psycho" featuring American hip hop recording artist ASAP Ferg was released on October 26, 2015. "The Kids Aren't Alright" featuring American rapper, singer and songwriter Azealia Banks was released on October 27, 2015.  "Uma Thurman" featuring American rapper, songwriter and actor Wiz Khalifa was released on October 28, 2015. The "Uma Thurman" remix was previously released in January 2015 for the Boys of Zummer tour.

Track listing

Notes
"Centuries" contains elements of "Tom's Diner" by Suzanne Vega
  signifies a remix producer
  signifies a co-producer

Charts

References

External links

Make America Psycho Again at YouTube (streamed copy where licensed)

2015 remix albums
2016 United States presidential election in popular culture
Fall Out Boy albums
Island Records remix albums
Songs about Donald Trump